Name                    : XXXVI Thailand National Games

Host Province : Nakhon Si Thammarat

Province participating  : 76 Provinces

Athletes participating  : --- Athletes

Events                  : 31 sports

Opening ceremony        : September 15, 2007

Closing ceremony        : September 25, 2007

Stadium                 : Nakhon Si Thammarat Province Central Stadium

Sports 

 Aquatics (Swimming)
 Athletics
 Badminton
 Basketball
 Billiards and Snooker
 Bodybuilding
 Boxing
 Cycling (Track, Road, and Mountain Biking)
 Dancesport
 Football
 Go
 Golf
 Gymnastics (Artistic and Rhythmic)
 Handball
 Hoop takraw
 Judo
 Kabaddi
 Muay Thai
 Pétanque
 Rowing
 Rugby football
 Sepak takraw
 Shooting
 Silat
 Softball
 Taekwondo
 Table tennis
 Tennis
 Volleyball (Indoor and Beach)
 Weightlifting
 Wrestling
 Wushu

Top ten medals

External links
Official Website of the 36th Thailand National Games in Nakhon Si Thammarat

National Games
Thailand National Games
National Games
Thailand National Games
National Games